The 1974 Yale Bulldogs football team represented Yale University in the 1974 NCAA Division I football season.  The Bulldogs were led by tenth-year head coach Carmen Cozza, played their home games at the Yale Bowl and tied for first place in the Ivy League with a 6–1 record, 8–1 overall.

Schedule

References

Yale
Yale Bulldogs football seasons
Ivy League football champion seasons
Yale Bulldogs football